John Douglas Smart (December 4, 1936 – November 18, 2019) was an American basketball player. He played college basketball for the University of Washington, where he was an All-American as a senior.

Smart was born and raised in Seattle. He played for Garfield High School, where he averaged 26.7 points per game and led the team to a state championship in 1955. Following the close of his high school career, Smart chose the hometown Washington Huskies for college. He was a three-year starter for coach Tippy Dye, averaging 18.9 points and 13.5 rebounds per game for his career. He was named to the All-Pacific Coast Conference (now Pac-12) team each of his three varsity seasons. He was an Associated Press (AP) honorable mention all three years and a third-team All-American by the United Press International (UPI) as a senior in 1959.

Smart finished his career as the school’s all-time leading rebounder with 1,051 rebounds (since eclipsed).

Following his college career, he was drafted by the Detroit Pistons in the seventh round (48th pick overall) of the 1959 NBA draft. Smart decided against pursuing a professional career, instead becoming a dentist.

Smart died on November 18, 2019 at the age of 82.

References

1936 births
2019 deaths
American dentists
All-American college men's basketball players
American men's basketball players
Basketball players from Seattle
Detroit Pistons draft picks
Garfield High School (Seattle) alumni
Power forwards (basketball)
Washington Huskies men's basketball players
20th-century dentists